The Conquest of Touat and Gourara in 1583 was a military expedition led by the Saadi Sultan of Morocco Ahmad al-Mansur to conquer the oases of Touat and Gourara.

Conquest 
In 1582, Sultan Ahmad al-Mansur seized the Touat and the Gourara oases.

See also 

 Laghouat Expedition (1708–1713)

References 

16th century in Algeria